The Sound of Violence may refer to:
 The Sound of Violence (song), a 2002 song by French electronic duo Cassius
 The Sound of Violence (album), an album by Bahraini thrash metal band Motör Militia
 The Sound of Violence, a 2015 song by Parkway Drive from Ire

See also
 The Sound of Silence, a song by Simon and Garfunkel